The Diocese of Zamora is a Latin Church ecclesiastical territory or diocese of the Catholic Church. The diocese is a suffragan in the ecclesiastical province of the metropolitan Archdiocese of Morelia. It was erected on 26 January 1863. It has two co-cathedrals in the episcopal see of Zamora, Michoacán: Cathedral of the Immaculate Conception of Mary and Cathedral of Our Lady of Guadalupe

Bishops

Ordinaries
José Antonio de la Peña y Navarro (1863-1877) 
José María Cázares y Martínez (1878-1908) 
José de Jesús Fernández y Barragán (1908-1909) 
José Othón Núñez y Zárate (1909-1922), appointed Coadjutor Archbishop of Antequera, Oaxaca
Manuel Fulcheri y Pietrasanta (1922-1946) 
José Gabriel Anaya y Diez de Bonilla (1947-1967) 
José Salazar López (1967-1970), appointed Archbishop of Guadalajara, Jalisco (Cardinal in 1973)
Adolfo Hernández Hurtado (1970-1974) 
José Esaul Robles Jiménez (1974-1993) 
Carlos Suárez Cázares (1994-2006)
Javier Navarro Rodríguez (2007–Present)

Coadjutor bishop
José de Jesús Fernández y Barragán (1899-1908)
José Salazar López (1961-1967); later made cardinal

Auxiliary bishop
Jaime Calderón Calderón (2012-2018), appointed Bishop of Tapachula, Chiapas

Other priests of this diocese who became bishops
Vicente Castellanos y Núñez, appointed Bishop of Campeche in 1912
Antonio Guízar y Valencia, appointed Bishop of Chihuahua in 1920
José de Jesús Sahagún de la Parra, appointed Bishop of Tula, Hidalgo in 1961
José de Jesús Garcia Ayala, appointed Auxiliary Bishop of Campeche in 1963
José Luis Amezcua Melgoza, appointed Bishop of Campeche in 1995
José Armando Álvarez Cano, appointed Prelate of Huautla, Oaxaca in 2011
Rafael Valdéz Torres, appointed Bishop of Ensenada, Baja California Norte in 2013

Institutions for Catholic Education 
 Seminary of Zamora
 Institute Cázares

Saints, beati, and servants of God of the Diocese of Zamora in Mexico
 Rafael Guízar y Valencia (1878-1938)
 José Ma. Cázares y Martínez (1832-1909)
 José Sánchez del Río (1913-1928)

Territorial losses

Episcopal See
Zamora, Michoacán

See also
Immaculate Conception Cathedral, Zamora de Hidalgo

External links and references
Diócesis de Zamora official site (in Spanish)

Zamora
Zamora in Mexico
Zamora in Mexico
Zamora in Mexico, Roman Catholic Diocese of
1863 establishments in Mexico